Saleh Mohammad (born April 27, 1986) is a Syrian swimmer, who specialized in open water marathon. He represented his Syria in the inaugural 10 km race at the 2008 Summer Olympics, and has also won a career total of four medals (three golds and one silver) in a major international open water competition, spanning two editions of the Asian Beach Games (2008 and 2010).

Mohammad competed as a lone open water swimmer for Syria in the inaugural men's 10 km marathon at the 2008 Summer Olympics in Beijing. Leading up to the Games, he finished with a twenty-third place time of 1:54:45.5, but managed to pick up the continental spot as Asia's representative at the FINA World Open Water Swimming Championships in Seville, Spain. Farther from the leaders by about ten body lengths, Mohammad nearly pulled from the end of the field to claim the nineteenth spot out of twenty-four entrants in 1:54:37.7, two minutes and forty-six seconds (2:46) behind eventual gold medalist Maarten van der Weijden of the Netherlands.

References

External links
NBC 2008 Olympics profile

1986 births
Living people
Syrian male swimmers
Olympic swimmers of Syria
Swimmers at the 2008 Summer Olympics
Male long-distance swimmers
Sportspeople from Damascus
21st-century Syrian people